The 1917 Allan Cup was the Canadian senior ice hockey championship for the 1916–17 season. The title was first held by the Winnipeg Victorias who won their league and two challenges, before losing in the final challenge to the Toronto Dentals.

League championship
The defending 1916 Allan Cup champions, Winnipeg 61st Battalion, did not compete due to the war.  As champions of the Winnipeg Patriotic League, the Winnipeg Victorias take over the Allan Cup title.

First challenge
The Winnipeg Victorias were challenged by the Winnipeg Union Canadienne, Winnipeg & District League champions.  The series took place in Winnipeg, Manitoba.

Winnipeg Victorias (Allan Cup holder)
Winnipeg Union Canadienne
(Challenger)

Results
Winnipeg Victorias 13 - Winnipeg Union Canadienne 6
Winnipeg Victorias 9 - Winnipeg Union Canadienne 5

Winnipeg Victorias win the series 22-11 and retain the Allan Cup.

Second challenge
The Winnipeg Victorias received a challenge from the Winnipeg 221st Battalion, Manitoba Military League champions.  The series took place in Winnipeg, Manitoba.

Winnipeg Victorias (Allan Cup holder)
Winnipeg 221st Battalion
(Challenger)

Results
Winnipeg Victorias 5 - Winnipeg 221st Battalion 4
Winnipeg Victorias 6 - Winnipeg 221st Battalion 1

Winnipeg Victorias win the series 11-5 and retain the Allan Cup.

Third challenge
The Winnipeg Victorias received a challenge from the Port Arthur 141st Battalion, Thunder Bay Senior champions.  Played in Winnipeg, Manitoba.

Winnipeg Victorias (Allan Cup holder)
Port Arthur 141st Battalion
(Challenger)

Results
Winnipeg Victorias 5 - Port Arthur 141st Battalion 1
Winnipeg Victorias 5 - Port Arthur 141st Battalion 4

Winnipeg Victorias win the series 10-5 and retain the Allan Cup.

Fourth challenge
Winnipeg Victorias received a challenge from the Toronto Dentals, OHA Senior champions.  Played in Winnipeg, Manitoba.

Winnipeg Victorias (Allan Cup holder)
Toronto Dentals (Challenger)

Results
Toronto Dentals 9 - Winnipeg Victorias 6
Winnipeg Victorias 6 - Toronto Dentals 4

Toronto Dentals take the Allan Cup, winning the series 13-goals-to-12.

External links
Allan Cup archives 
Allan Cup website

Allan
Allan Cup
Allan Cup 1917